Honey, We Shrunk Ourselves is a 1997 American science fiction comedy film, and the third installment in the Honey, I Shrunk the Kids film series. The film marks the directorial debut of cinematographer Dean Cundey and was released through Walt Disney Home Video as a direct-to-home video film. The plot tells the story of inventor Wayne Szalinski as he accidentally shrinks himself, his wife, brother, and sister-in-law with his electromagnetic shrink ray.

Rick Moranis returns as Wayne Szalinski, and is the only cast member from the previous films to reprise their role. Eve Gordon replaces Marcia Strassman as Diane Szalinski, and their youngest son Adam, now a pre-teen, is played by Bug Hall. Wayne and Diane's two older children, Amy and Nick, do not appear but are mentioned as having gone away to college and living adult lives. The cast includes Wayne's extended family, including his brother, Gordon, sister-in-law Patti (mentioned in the first film when Diane was on the phone with her looking for Amy), and niece and nephew Jenny and Mitch.

The film is also the first Walt Disney Pictures live-action direct-to-video release, and stands as Moranis' most recent live-action film role, though he would continue to do voice-acting for the next several years. The franchise continued with a television series adaptation, which aired on broadcast syndication.

The film series will continue with the soft reboot Shrunk, which will see Josh Gad play Nick Szalinski, and Moranis will come out of his semi-retirement to reprise the role of Wayne. Joe Johnston (who directed the first film) will also return to direct the sequel. The film will be a Disney+ release.

Plot
Five years after the events of the previous film, ten-year-old Adam wants to go to baseball camp. However, his interest in sports seems almost alien to Wayne, although Diane is more understanding. Wayne has started his own lab, Szalinski Labs, with his brother, Gordon. One day, they receive tickets to witness a shuttle landing, but Diane reminds him over the phone that he needs to watch Adam and his cousins, Jenny and Mitch, while she and Gordon's wife Patti go on vacation. She also reminds him to get rid of a Tiki Man sculpture they keep in the house that she sees as an eyesore, though he considers it a good luck charm.

After Diane and Patti leave, Wayne and Gordon have activities planned that bore the kids. Wayne sends them to the store, but reveals to Gordon that it is a ruse to get rid of them long enough so that he can use his shrinking machine in order to shrink the Tiki Man without Diane's knowledge, and spare any accidents with the kids.  However, after carelessly not turning it off immediately after they succeed, Wayne and Gordon are shrunk when a billiard ball left on it falls onto the activating button, just as they are in front of it searching for the Tiki Man. Meanwhile, Patti realizes she forgot to leave Mitch's medicine for his potassium deficiency, and they head back. Hoping to catch Wayne and Gordon by surprise, they sneak up to the attic only to be shrunk when another billiard ball falls onto the activating button. Shortly after, the kids return home, and after hearing Wayne's previous message about the launch, assume they are alone for the evening.  Jenny makes plans to have her friends come over. Upstairs, the adults make use of a fishing rod to lower themselves down into Adam's room. To attempt to get to the floor, they use his Hot Wheels race track, but they overshoot their target and fall down the laundry chute ending up in a clean load that is delivered back upstairs by Adam and Mitch. They tumble out of the laundry basket when it is overturned, and discover Adam and Mitch reading a Sports Illustrated Kids magazine, revealing to Wayne that Adam's interest is not in science as he hoped. The four suddenly encounter a cockroach, but manage to defeat it by luring it into a bug trap.

Seeing Mitch struggling, Patti realizes that they need to get him his medicine soon, or he could pass out. He ignores his weaknesses, though, and goes downstairs. The adults witness the arrival of Jenny's friends and decide to use a bubble machine in order to get downstairs. Diane and Patti land safely, but Wayne and Gordon fall into a bowl of onion dip and are nearly devoured by the girls.

In the kitchen, when Patti and Diane resolve to find a way up the counter in order to find Mitch's medicine and push it into view, they encounter a daddy long-legs with its leg caught in a spider web, and Diane quietly talks to it as Patti tries to cut the web with a nail file. Diane realizes her own insecurities about being small as she relates to it, which she had earlier tried to kill, and realizes how hard it is to be that size. After it's freed, Patti and Diane realize they can cling to its silk as it climbs up onto the counter. Meanwhile, Wayne and Gordon decide to rewire the stereo to work as a microphone. A group of boys begin to crash the party, including Jenny's crush, Ricky King. He takes her into the kitchen, where he steals a kiss from her, but she spurns him for not asking permission first, thus earning Patti's respect. Angered, he returns to his friends and they begin to wreak havoc in the living room. Mitch, severely weakened, enters the kitchen and discovers Patti and Diane on the counter before fainting, partially from his failure to take his medicine, and partially from the shock of seeing his miniature mother and aunt. Adam and Jenny discover him, and thinking quickly, Adam gets potassium-rich bananas to give to him, and he begins to recover, weakly saying he had seen his mother. In the living room, Adam stands up to Ricky before Wayne rewires the stereo so that Gordon can talk and amplify his voice. With this, he pretends to be the voice of God and orders Ricky and his friends to leave, leading Adam, Mitch, and Jenny to realize what has happened to them.

In the attic, the kids discuss the benefits of leaving their parents shrunk briefly before deciding they love them more than that, so they unshrink them to give them a chance to re-evaluate their parenting methods. Patti confides her trust in Jenny for how she stood up to Ricky and took care of Mitch, while Wayne tells Adam that he can have an interest in sports, and agrees to sign him up for baseball camp. Diane tells Wayne he can keep the Tiki Man, and won't sweat the "small" stuff anymore, while he decides to relinquish his presidency of Szalinski Labs to Gordon and return to inventing. In the end, life is back to normal again. Adam returns home from baseball camp, and Wayne has developed a new respect for baseball, and the Tiki Man has been moved into the backyard and enlarged to twice the height of the house.

Cast
Rick Moranis as Wayne Szalinski. He is the only returning actor from the other films in the franchise.
Eve Gordon as Diane Szalinski, Wayne's wife
Stuart Pankin as Gordon Szalinski, Wayne's brother
Robin Bartlett as Patricia "Patti" Szalinski, Gordon's wife and Diane's best friend
Bug Hall as Adam Szalinski, Wayne and Diane's son
Allison Mack as Jenny Szalinski, Gordon and Patty's daughter
Jake Richardson as Mitchell "Mitch" Szalinski, Gordon and Patty's son
Jojo Adams as Ricky King
Mila Kunis as Jill, Jenny's friend
Erica Luttrell as Jody, Jenny's friend
Lisa Wilhoit as Holly, Jenny's friend
Ashleigh Sterling as Corky, Jenny's friend
Theodore Borders as Trey, Ricky's friend
Bryson Aust as Vince, Ricky's friend 
Laura Dunn as Trina, Wayne's Personal Secretary at Szalinski Labs

Production
Originally, the film was going to be released in theaters for Christmas 1996. Karey Kirkpatrick was called in to write the script, while working on James and the Giant Peach. The finished script was sent in to Jeffrey Katzenberg, who decided that the studio did not want to continue with the film. It was shelved for a few months while Kirkpatrick resumed work on James and the Giant Peach. While working on it, Kirkpatrick learned that it was going to be picked up again.

The Walt Disney Company at the time was having success with releasing direct-to-video sequels, such as The Return of Jafar and Aladdin and the King of Thieves. They wanted to test how live-action sequels would do, so they picked this one to be their first.

Nell Scovell and Joel Hodgson were recruited to try to reduce Kirkpatrick's script due to the budget restraint. In Kirkpatrick's script, the group of shrunken parents would originally fall into an aquarium. The scene was cut from the script, and then revised to the bubble machine one. One scene shows one of Wayne's inventions, a machine that translates dog barks to human speech. It is similar to the devices in the "invention exchange" Hodgson did when with Mystery Science Theater 3000.

Casting
Rick Moranis was the only actor from the first two films to reprise his role. Marcia Strassman, who portrayed Diane in the first two films and in the 3D film, did not return and was replaced by Eve Gordon, best known for portraying as Marilyn Monroe in A Woman Named Jackie.

Amy O'Neill and Robert Oliveri, who had previously played Wayne's children Amy and Nick, had quit acting by the time the film was released; their characters were only mentioned in a conversation between Diane and Adam. Daniel and Joshua Shalikar, the twin actors who portrayed Adam in Honey, I Blew Up the Kid, had signed on for two additional sequels in 1992. They had reprised their role in Honey, I Shrunk the Audience, but Bug Hall replaced them in the part.

Stuart Pankin and Robin Bartlett were cast as Gordon and Patti Szalinski. Allison Mack and Jake Richardson were cast as their kids, Jenny and Mitch. Mack would later become famous as Chloe Sullivan on Smallville. Two of Jenny's friends are portrayed by Mila Kunis and Lisa Wilhoit. Kunis would later portray Jackie Burkhart on That '70s Show, and voice Meg Griffin on Family Guy while Wilhoit would later voice Connie D'Amico on the same show.

Direction
The film marked cinematographer Dean Cundey's directorial debut. His director of photography credits include Steven Spielberg's Jurassic Park, Hook, and some of John Carpenter's early directorial efforts such as Halloween (as well as its first two sequels), The Fog, Big Trouble in Little China, Escape from New York and The Thing. Originally when the film was going to be released to theaters, the production budget was $40 million. When it was announced that it would be released to home video, the budget was cut down to $7 million.

Due to the production cut, the studio decided to use television resolution to save money on effects by not having to pay for a projectable format. Also, the original script included that the party had gotten out of control with around 150 kids, akin to Sixteen Candles or Say Anything. This was considered too costly and it was cut down.

Despite the smaller budget, the availability of more advanced SFX technology created a more elaborate effect for the shrinking and enlarging sequences. Designer Carol Winstead Wood worked on product placement (see below) to increase her budget, enabling her to design & build more 'over scale' prop and set elements.

The film was digitally composited on three Apple Mac computers, using After Image and Ultimate software, at Cundey's home before it was sent to the Dream Quest effects company for finessing.

Reception

Sales
The film was released direct-to-video on March 18, 1997. It coincided with the video releases of The Long Kiss Goodnight and The First Wives Club.

Critical response

The film received mostly negative reviews from critics. On the film rating website Rotten Tomatoes, the film has an approval rating of 25%, based on 8 reviews.

See also
List of films featuring miniature people

References

External links
 

1997 films
1997 direct-to-video films
1990s science fiction comedy films
American children's comedy films
American science fiction comedy films
American sequel films
Direct-to-video sequel films
Disney direct-to-video films
Films about size change
Honey, I Shrunk the Kids (franchise) mass media
Films scored by Michael Tavera
Films with screenplays by Karey Kirkpatrick
Walt Disney Pictures films
1997 directorial debut films
1997 comedy films
1990s English-language films
Films set in 2000
1990s American films